Oleg Vyacheslavovich Yelyshev (born 30 May 1971) is a former Russian professional football player

Club career
He played for several clubs in Europe and Asia, including Baltika Kaliningrad and Fakel Voronezh in the Soviet First League, Dynamo Moscow, Tekstilshchik Kamyshin and Lokomotiv Moscow in the Russian Premier League and FC Seoul of the South Korean K-League, then known as Anyang LG Cheetahs. and Hapoel Haifa in the Israeli Premier League.

Honours 
 Korean League Cup Top Assists Award: 1997

External links
 
 Photograph at Anyang LG Cheetahs

1971 births
Sportspeople from Kaliningrad
Living people
Association football utility players
Russian footballers
Russian expatriate footballers
FC Baltika Kaliningrad players
FC Fakel Voronezh players
FC Dynamo Moscow players
FC Tekstilshchik Kamyshin players
FC Lokomotiv Moscow players
FC Seoul players
Hapoel Haifa F.C. players
Russian Premier League players
K League 1 players
Expatriate footballers in South Korea
Expatriate footballers in Israel
Russian expatriate sportspeople in South Korea
Association football midfielders
Association football forwards